The Logee House is a historic house on 225 Logee Street in Woonsocket, Rhode Island.  Built in 1729 by a French Huguenot family, this two-story wood-frame house is a rare early-18th-century house in the city, and one of its best-preserved.  The main block follows a plan more typical of colonial Massachusetts houses, unsurprising given the land it stands on was once disputed between the two colonies.  The main block has a central chimney, with single rooms on either side on both floors.  An ell, probably 18th century in origin, extends from the rear, and a 20th-century porch adorns the front of the house.

The house was listed on the National Register of Historic Places in 1982.

See also
National Register of Historic Places listings in Providence County, Rhode Island

References

Houses on the National Register of Historic Places in Rhode Island
Houses in Woonsocket, Rhode Island
National Register of Historic Places in Providence County, Rhode Island
Houses completed in 1729
1729 establishments in Rhode Island